El Wa3ra, sometimes written El Waara (translated as The Tricked), is an Algerian hidden camera pranking television series, created and produced by Rym Ghazali, and starring Ghazali herself alongside Chemseddine Lamrani. It airs every day during Ramadan, starting May 27, 2017, on Echorouk TV.

Background 
The series is presented by Algerian singer, actress, TV presenter and producer Rym Ghazali, alongside the YouTuber Chemseddine Lamrani, better known as DZjoker.

The idea of the program is to invite guests to different locations, and record them on hidden camera while they get in a frightening situation. The show mixes the actual images with scenes in which the participant views the hidden camera footage and comments on it.

According to Media & Market Research (MMR) agency, El Wa3ra is the most watched program during the 2017 Ramadan season. It is also considered by people and some media as "the best comic program" broadcast on Echorouk TV in Ramadan 2017, in terms of content.

The series is also viewed in Tunisia and Morocco, and by Maghrebis who are living in France. This success comes, according to Al Watan Voice, from the creativity in the various scenes filmed in Algeria, especially in the Algerian Desert, in addition to the participation of leading Algerian media and drama figures.

Episodes

References

External links
 

Television in Algeria
Algerian television series
Arabic-language television shows
2010s Algerian television series
Hidden camera television series
2017 Algerian television series debuts
2017 Algerian television series endings
Echorouk TV original programming